Tom Dixon (born August 21, 1961) is a former American football player.  He played college football at the University of Michigan and professional football for the Michigan Panthers of the United States Football League (USFL). He was a first-team All-American at the center position in 1983.

Dixon grew up in Indiana and attended Bishop Dwenger High School in Fort Wayne, Indiana.  He enrolled at the University of Michigan in 1980 and played for Bo Schembechler's Michigan Wolverines football teams from 1980 to 1983.  Dixon started every game for the Wolverines in the 1981, 1982, and 1983 seasons.  As a junior, he was selected by both the conference coaches (UPI) and media (AP) as the first-team center on the 1982 All-Big Ten Conference football team.  As a senior, he was selected by the Associated Press, American Football Coaches Association and the Sporting News as a first-team center on the 1983 College Football All-America Team.

In April 1984, Dixon signed to play professional football for the Michigan Panthers of the United States Football League (USFL).  He played for the Panthers in 1984, but the team disbanded after the 1984 season.  He signed with the Pittsburgh Steelers in May 1985, then quit the team in late July 1985.

References 

1961 births
Living people
American football centers
Michigan Wolverines football players
Michigan Panthers players
Players of American football from Fort Wayne, Indiana